William James Lovie (December 30, 1868 – November 24, 1938) was a Canadian farmer and politician.

Born in Aberdeenshire, Scotland, the son of James Lovie and Isabella Moir, Lovie attended Skene Parish Common School in Aberdeenshire before emigrating to Canada in 1885. He settled in Holland, Manitoba where he was a farmer. He was Secretary-Treasurer of the United Farmers of Manitoba for 18 years. He was first elected to the House of Commons of Canada for Macdonald in 1921. A Progressive, he was re-elected in 1925 and 1926. He did not run for re-election in 1930. He died in 1938 in Holland, Manitoba.

References

External links
 

1868 births
1938 deaths
Members of the House of Commons of Canada from Manitoba
People from Aberdeenshire
Progressive Party of Canada MPs
Scottish emigrants to Canada